The Arab Liberal Federation (ALF) is a network of liberal political parties, organizations and activists from Arab countries. It was formed in 2008 in Cairo under the name of Network of Arab Liberals (NAL). Wael Nawara of the Egyptian El-Ghad Party was elected as a first president. The network was renamed The Arab Alliance for Freedom and Democracy in 2011, reacting to the negative connotations that the term 'liberal' has in some Arab countries. In March 2016, the Alliance was renamed to its current name using the term 'Liberal' as ideological identification.

The network is affiliated to Liberal International federation, and receives support from the European ALDE Party and the German Friedrich Naumann Foundation and the VVD of Netherlands.

Leadership
In March 2016, ALF met in the Tunisian capital, Tunis, to elect new leaders.

Dr. Mahmoud Alaily of FEP (Egypt) was elected as president, and Mohamed Ouzzine of MP (Morocco) was elected as secretary general.

Former leaders:
 2008–2012: Dr. Wael Nuwwara – El-Ghad Party – Egypt
 2012–2016: Saed Karajeh – Free Thought Forum – Jordan
 2016– : Dr. Mahmoud Alaily – Free Egyptians Party – Egypt

Members
Political parties
 (See Liberalism in Egypt)
 Free Egyptians Party
 Congress Party
 Free Egypt Party

 National Liberal Party
 Future Movement

 Popular Movement
 Constitutional Union

 

 CAHDİ Party

 Liberal Democratic Party

 Afek Tounes

Other organisations and individuals

 Free Thought Forum
 Mohamed Arslan, former MP

 Freedom Forum

References

External links
 Arab Liberal Federation website

Arab political parties
International liberal organizations
Liberalism in the Arab world
Organizations established in 2008
Political party alliances in Africa
Political party alliances in Asia